The 1975 Arizona Wildcats football team represented the University of Arizona in the Western Athletic Conference (WAC) during the 1975 NCAA Division I football season.  In their third season under head coach Jim Young, the Wildcats compiled a 9–2 record (5–2 against WAC opponents), finished in second place in the WAC, were ranked No. 18 in the final AP Poll, and outscored their opponents, 330 to 169.  The team played its home games in Arizona Stadium in Tucson, Arizona.

Even though they captured their second straight nine-win season, the Wildcats lost out on a bowl due to not winning an outright conference title for the third season in a row. Arizona lost in the season finale to rival Arizona State in a game that decided the WAC title. Both of Arizona's losses this season were to their rivals (New Mexico and Arizona State).

The team's statistical leaders included Bruce Hill with 1,747 passing yards, Dave Randolph with 657 rushing yards, and Scott Piper with 718 receiving yards. Linebacker Obra Erby led the team with 188 total tackles.

Before the season
Arizona concluded the 1974 season with a 9–2 record (6–1 in WAC), and lost out on the WAC title and bowl eligibility due to their loss to BYU that season. The Wildcats ended the year by defeating Arizona State for the first time since 1964 with a shutout and brought back bragging rights for the state of Arizona. The team went into the 1975 season with high expectations and was looking to contend for the WAC championship and was ranked in the top 20 in preseason polls. Many Wildcat fans believed that Young was rebuilding a resurgence of winning to a football program that was struggling for nearly a decade.

Schedule

Game summaries

Northwestern
In a game that featured two teams that shared the same nickname, the Wildcats, Arizona took care of Northwestern at home. Arizona gave up two field goals to Northwestern, and ended a streak of three consecutive shutout wins dating back to the previous season finale against Arizona State (Arizona began 1975 with shutouts over Pacific and Wyoming).

New Mexico
In the rivalry game between Arizona and New Mexico, both teams’ offense put up several points on the board, with the Lobos coming out on top to upset the Wildcats and handed Arizona its first loss of the season. The Wildcats’ loss led to the Kit Carson Rifle (the rivalry's trophy) returning to Albuquerque for the first time since 1971.

San Diego State
Arizona faced San Diego State on the road for a top-15 non-conference matchup (the Wildcats were ranked 15th whereas the Aztecs were 13th). The game was a big test for Arizona, and the Wildcats ultimately prevailed in a close win.

Colorado State
Against Colorado State, the Wildcats’ defense blitzed the Rams and limited them to only nine points in yet another win. This remains the last time to date that Arizona traveled to Fort Collins to play the Rams, as future meetings between the two teams since then have been played in Tucson.

Arizona State
The Wildcats traveled to Tempe to face unbeaten Arizona State in a game that decided the WAC championship and a berth in the Fiesta Bowl (the loser would have their season end due to a lack of bowl spots available). Due to the fact that cable and satellite television didn't exist at the time and that all national broadcasters’ schedules of games were booked, the Arizona-Arizona State game was not televised.

Late in the second quarter with Arizona leading 14–3, the Sun Devils drove into Wildcat territory and an Arizona State receiver dove and made a sensational catch in the end zone for a touchdown. There has been debates of whether or not it was indeed a catch, in which many Wildcat fans believe it was not. Due to a lack of instant replay at the time and that all officials’ calls were based on judgment and thus were final, the touchdown catch was upheld, much to the ire of Wildcat fans. The disputes of the ASU touchdown catch still continue to this day.

The touchdown gave ASU momentum at halftime and carried it with them in the second half and took the lead. The Wildcats had a chance to respond, but fell short and Arizona State went on to capture the WAC with the win and ended the Wildcats’ season. Arizona matched the 1974 season with back-to-back 9–2 records but without a bowl appearance. Arizona State would ultimately go on to win the Fiesta Bowl and finish with a perfect 12–0 record.

References

Arizona
Arizona Wildcats football seasons
Arizona Wildcats football